Abū Ṭāhir al-Silafī (born Isfahan in 472 AH/1079 CE, died Alexandria in 576/1180), was a leading scholar and teacher in twelfth-century Egypt. Among his many works is the Mu‘jam al-safar (the Dictionary of Travel), a biographical dictionary: 'covering from 511/1117 to 560/1164, the Mu‘jam can be regarded as a digest of intellectual life in late Fāṭimī Alexandria'. Al-Silafī ran the second madrasa to be built in Egypt (and the first Shāfi‘ī one there), built in Alexandria in 1149 on the order of Alexandria's then-governor, the Shāfi‘ī al-‘Ādil ibn Salār, vizier to Caliph al-Ẓāfir. It was named ‘Ādiliyya after its founder, but became popularly known as al-Silafiyya after its leading teacher. Probably in 1118, al-Silafī married Sitt al-Ahl bint al-Khalwānī; their daughter Khadīja (d. 1226) married the scholar Abu’l-Ḥarām Makkī b. ‘Abd al-Raḥmān al-Ṭrabulsī, whose son, Abu’l-Qāsim ‘Abd al-Raḥmān (born 1174), also became an important scholar in Alexandria.

Key studies
 Rizzitano, U. “Akhbār ‘an ba‘ḍ muslimī ṣiqilliya alladhīna tarjama la-hum Abū Ṭāhir al-Silafī,” Annals of the Faculty of Arts, Uni. of ‘Ayn Shams, 3 (1955): pp. 49-112
 ‘Abbās, I. Akhbār wa tarājim Andalusiyya al-mustakhraja min Mu ‘jam al-safar li al-Silafī. Beirut, 1963
 Zaman, S.M. Abū Ṭāhir al-Silafī al-Iṣbahānī. His life and works with an analytical study of his Mu‘jam al-safar. PhD thesis, Harvard Univ., Cambridge (Mass.), 1968
 Ṣāliḥ, Ḥ. The life and times of al-Ḥāfiẓ Abū Ṭāhir al-Silafī accompanied by a critical edition of part of the author’s Mu‘jam al-safar. PhD thesis, Univ. of Cambridge, 1972
 Ma ‘rūf, B. A. “Mu‘jam al-safar li-Abī Ṭāhir al-Silafī,” al-Mawrid, 8 (1979): pp. 379–383
 Zaman, S.M. Mu‘jam al-safar. Islamabad, 1988

References

Sources
 

Egyptian writers
1079 births
1180 deaths
12th-century Arabic writers
12th-century people from the Fatimid Caliphate
Medieval Alexandria
Writers from Isfahan
12th-century Iranian people